
Gmina Osiek is an urban-rural gmina (administrative district) in Staszów County, Świętokrzyskie Voivodeship, in south-central Poland.

Demography 
According to the 2011 Poland census, there were 7,904 people residing in Osiek Commune, of whom 50.9% were male and 49.1% were female (out of which the population in rural areas amounts to 5,903, of whom 51.2% were male and 48.8% were female). In the commune, the population was spread out, with 21.2% under the age of 18, 39.3% from 18 to 44, 21.5% from 45 to 64, and 18% who were 65 years of age or older (out of which the population in rural areas amounts to 21.1% under the age of 18, 39.5% from 18 to 44, 20.9% from 45 to 64, and 18.5% who were 65 years of age or older).
 Figure 1. Population pyramid of commune in 2010 – by age group and sex
 Figure 2. Population pyramid in rural areas in 2010 – by age group and sex

Villages
Apart from the town of Osiek, Gmina Osiek contains the villages and settlements of Bukowa, Długołęka, Kąty, Łęg, Lipnik, Matiaszów, Mikołajów, Mucharzew, Nakol, Niekrasów, Niekurza, Ossala, Ossala-Lesisko, Pliskowola, Strużki, Suchowola, Sworoń, Szwagrów, Trzcianka, Trzcianka-Kolonia and Tursko Wielkie.

Neighbouring gminas
Gmina Osiek is bordered by the gminas of Baranów Sandomierski, Gawłuszowice, Łoniów, Padew Narodowa, Połaniec, Rytwiany and Staszów.

References

External links
Polish official population figures 2006

Osiek
Staszów County